Peter Oghenebrorhien Omoduemuke (born 9 June 1984) is a Nigerian professional footballer who plays as a midfielder.

Career
As a teenager, Omoduemuke moved to Italy and signed with Livorno. He subsequently joined Alessandria in 2001, before returning to Livorno in 2002. Afterwards, Omoduemuke also played for Massese, as well as Vigevano. He later moved to Serbia and Montenegro and joined Partizan, but was immediately loaned to affiliate side Teleoptik. In September 2005, Omoduemuke broke Vladimir Vukajlović's leg with a tackle during a training session. He was then sent on loan to top-flight club Obilić in early 2006.

In late 2006, Omoduemuke moved to Romania for a trial at Politehnica Timișoara. He later signed with the club, helping the side reach the 2007 Cupa României Final. Over the next few years, Omoduemuke also played for Ceahlăul Piatra Neamț and Minerul Lupeni.

Between 2013 and 2015, Omoduemuke played for Vietnamese clubs Ninh Bình, Than Quảng Ninh, and Đồng Nai.

Honours
Politehnica Timișoara
 Cupa României: Runner-up 2006–07
Ninh Bình
 Vietnamese Cup: 2013

References

External links
 
 
 Museo Grigio

Nigerian footballers
U.S. Livorno 1915 players
Association football midfielders
CS Minerul Lupeni players
CSM Ceahlăul Piatra Neamț players
Dong Nai FC players
Expatriate footballers in Italy
Expatriate footballers in Romania
Expatriate footballers in Serbia and Montenegro
Expatriate footballers in Vietnam
FC Politehnica Timișoara players
First League of Serbia and Montenegro players
FK Obilić players
FK Partizan players
FK Teleoptik players
Liga I players
Liga II players
Nigerian expatriate footballers
Nigerian expatriate sportspeople in Italy
Nigerian expatriate sportspeople in Romania
Nigerian expatriate sportspeople in Serbia and Montenegro
Nigerian expatriate sportspeople in Vietnam
Than Quang Ninh FC players
U.S. Alessandria Calcio 1912 players
V.League 1 players
1984 births
Living people
Vigevano Calcio players